The following lists events that happened during 1938 in the Union of Soviet Socialist Republics.

Incumbents
 General Secretary of the Communist Party of the Soviet Union – Joseph Stalin
 Chairman of the Presidium of the Supreme Soviet of the Soviet Union – Mikhail Kalinin
 Chairman of the Council of People's Commissars of the Soviet Union – Vyacheslav Molotov

Events
 March – Trial of the Twenty-One
 15 March – The Soviet Union announces officially that Nikolai Bukharin has been executed.
 29 July–11 August – Battle of Lake Khasan
 2 September – Soviet Ambassador to Britain Ivan Maisky calls on Winston Churchill, telling him that Soviet Foreign Commissar Maxim Litvinov has expressed to the French chargé d'affaires in Moscow that the Soviet Union is willing to fight over the territorial integrity of Czechoslovakia.
unknown date – Family plots produce 22% of all Soviet agricultural produce, on only 4% of all cultivated land.

Births
 January 2 – Anatoly Samoilenko, Ukrainian mathematician (died 2020) 
 January 8 – Yevgeny Nesterenko, Russian operatic bass (died 2021)
 January 18 – Stepan Topal, Moldovan politician (died 2018)
 February 24 – Emma Gapchenko, archer
 June 24 – Boris Lagutin, boxer
 July 9 – Liya Akhedzhakova, Russian actress 
 July 10 – Vera Shebeko, Russian anchorwoman
 July 14 – Lillian Malkina, Russian actress
 July 18 – Valery Kerdemelidi, Russian artistic gymnast
 July 21 – Vladimir Radionov, Russian football player, coach and official
 July 22 – Mark Rakita, Russian sabreur and coach
 August 9 – Oleksandr Omelchenko, Ukrainian politician, Mayor of Kyiv (died 2021)
 August 19 – Valentin Mankin, Ukrainian Soviet sailor, Olympic triple champion and silver medalist (died 2014)
 November 11 – Ants Antson, Estonian speed skater (died 2015)

Deaths
 January 22 – Sergei Buturlin, Soviet ornithologist (b. 1872)
 February 8 
 Mikhail Batorsky, Soviet komkor (executed) (b. 1890)
 Nikolai Kuzmin, Soviet political and military leader (executed) (b. 1883)
 March 15 – Nikolai Bukharin, Alexei Rykov, Nikolay Krestinsky, Genrikh Yagoda, Arkady Rosengolts, Vladimir Ivanovich Ivanov, Mikhail Alexandrovich Chernov, Hryhoriy Hrynko, Fayzulla Khodzhayev and Vasily Sharangovich
 June 20 – Nikolai Janson, Russian politician (shot)
 July 28 – Yakov Alksnis
 July 29 – Pavel Dybenko
 August 16 – Sergey Aydarov, actor (b. 1867)
 August 22 – Eduard Lepin, Latvian-born Soviet general (b. 1889)
 November 9 – Vasily Blyukher
 December 15 – Valery Chkalov, test pilot (b. 1904)
 December 27 – Osip Mandelstam, poet (b. 1891)

See also
 1938 in fine arts of the Soviet Union
 List of Soviet films of 1938

References

 
1930s in the Soviet Union